Ulrich Lehmann (born 1944) is a Swiss equestrian. He won a silver medal in team dressage at the 1976 Summer Olympics in Montreal, together with Christine Stückelberger and Doris Ramseier.

References

External links

1944 births
Living people
Swiss male equestrians
Swiss dressage riders
Olympic equestrians of Switzerland
Olympic silver medalists for Switzerland
Equestrians at the 1976 Summer Olympics
Olympic medalists in equestrian
Medalists at the 1976 Summer Olympics
20th-century Swiss people